Bert Edwards may refer to:
Bert Edwards (cricketer) (1913–2002), English cricketer
Bert Edwards (footballer) (1915–1995), Australian rules footballer
Bert Edwards (politician) (1887–1963), Australian publican and politician

See also
Herbert Edwards (disambiguation)
Robert Edwards (disambiguation)
Albert Edwards (disambiguation)